The Jacksonville Business Journal is a weekly newspaper and daily website in Jacksonville, Florida. Part of the American City Business Journals, it covers business news in Jacksonville and Northeast Florida. It began publishing in 1985.

The paid-circulation newspaper is published on Fridays and a digital edition of the newspaper is also published. The web site publishes business news and information throughout the week. A daily email of the day's news is available for email subscribers.

The Jacksonville Business Journal publishes annually a Book of Lists, which contains updated, ranked lists on a subjects including largest employers, largest companies, largest law firms, and similar lists. The Jacksonville Business Journal sells display advertising and classified advertising for its weekly newspaper and online advertising for its web site.

References

External links
 Business Journal of Jacksonville online

Business newspapers published in the United States
Mass media in Jacksonville, Florida
Newspapers published in Florida
Weekly newspapers published in the United States
Northbank, Jacksonville
1985 establishments in Florida
Publications established in 1985